Keith Levy, known professionally as Sherry Vine, is an American actor, drag queen, and musician. Vine is the creator and host of She's Living for This, a variety series on here TV.

Vine works primarily in New York City and on Fire Island, Long Island, but has also performed across the United States and Europe. She is known for her parodies of popular songs.

Career
Vine was born Keith Levy in Florida, but grew up in Maryland. Keith Levy has performed in drag as Sherry Vine since 1992. His first time in drag was for a one-act play in Los Angeles, called Sorry, Wrong Number.

Vine is a fixture in the New York City drag circuit. In the 1990s, he often performed in Theater Couture shows in the East Village with Jackie Beat and Mario Diaz. Theatre Couture was founded by Vine, Joe Gross, and Douglass Sanders in 1992. Vine also performed at Bar d'O, a lounge in the West Village, in weekly shows with Joey Arias, Raven O and Sade Pendarvis.

In 2010, Vine was featured in the web series Queens of Drag: NYC by gay.com. The series featured fellow New York drag queens Bianca Del Rio, Dallas DuBois, Hedda Lettuce, Lady Bunny, Mimi Imfurst, and Peppermint.

Songs
Vine performs a wide variety of parodies. She has parodied Madonna, Britney Spears, Rihanna, Adele, and Lady Gaga, including the songs "Poker Face" and "Paparazzi". Vine has filmed videos of many of her parodies.

Filmography

Film

Television

Web series

Music videos

Theatre

See also
 LGBT culture in New York City
 List of LGBT people from New York City

References

External links

American drag queens
American gay actors
American gay musicians
Living people
Nightlife in New York City
LGBT people from Florida
Year of birth missing (living people)